Jaylen Clinton Andrew Nowell (born July 9, 1999) is an American professional basketball player for the Minnesota Timberwolves of the National Basketball Association (NBA). He played college basketball for the Washington Huskies of the Pac-12 Conference, and was named the conference's player of the year in 2019. He was selected by the Timberwolves in the second round of the 2019 NBA draft.

Early life
Nowell was born in Seattle to Lanie and Mike Nowell. His parents met at Clark Atlanta University, where they both played basketball. His father played professionally in the Continental Basketball Association. Jaylen Nowell attended high school in Seattle at Garfield High, where he was a standout player.

College career
At the University of Washington, Nowell was originally part of a five-player recruiting class considered the best in the Huskies' history. However, after Washington coach Lorenzo Romar was fired, he was the lone member who remained committed to the school and first-year coach Mike Hopkins. As a freshman in 2017–18, Nowell averaged 16.0 points per game. The following season, he was named the Pac-12 Player of the Year after leading the Huskies in scoring and helping them win the Pac-12 regular season championship.

Following Washington's loss in the 2019 NCAA men's basketball tournament, Nowell announced his intention to forgo his final two seasons of collegiate eligibility and declare for the 2019 NBA draft.

Professional career

Minnesota Timberwolves (2019–present)
On June 20, 2019, Nowell was selected with the 43rd overall pick in the 2nd round by the Minnesota Timberwolves in the 2019 NBA draft. He was later included in the Timberwolves' roster for the 2019 NBA Summer League. On August 6, Nowell signed with the Timberwolves. He made his NBA debut on November 6, playing one minute in a 121–137 loss to the Memphis Grizzlies. On January 1, 2020, Nowell scored a season-high 12 points, alongside two rebounds, in a 104–106 loss to the Milwaukee Bucks.

On March 11, 2021, Nowell scored a season-high 28 points, alongside five rebounds and six assists, in a 135–105 win over the New Orleans Pelicans.

On December 27, 2021, Nowell scored a career-high 29 points, alongside six rebounds and three assists, in a 108–103 win over the Boston Celtics. The Timberwolves qualified for the postseason for the first time since 2018 and faced the Memphis Grizzlies during their first round series. Nowell made his playoff debut on April 19, 2022, scoring six points in a 96–124 Game 2 loss. The Timberwolves were eliminated by the Grizzlies in six games.

Career statistics

NBA

Regular season

|-
| style="text-align:left;"|
| style="text-align:left;"|Minnesota
| 15 || 0 || 10.1 || .358 || .115 || .941 || .9 || 1.3 || .2 || .1 || 3.8
|-
| style="text-align:left;"|
| style="text-align:left;"|Minnesota
| 42 || 0 || 18.1 || .424 || .333 || .818 || 2.3 || 1.5 || .5 || .3 || 9.0
|-
| style="text-align:left;"|
| style="text-align:left;"|Minnesota
| 62 || 1 || 15.7 || .475 || .394 || .783 || 2.0 || 2.1 || .4 || .2 || 8.5
|- class="sortbottom"
| style="text-align:center;" colspan="2"|Career
| 119 || 1 || 15.8 || .446 || .345 || .811 || 1.9 || 1.8 || .4 || .2 || 8.1

Playoffs

|-
| style="text-align:left;"|2022
| style="text-align:left;"|Minnesota
| 1 || 0 || 12.0 || .300 || .000 || — || .0 || 1.0 || 1.0 || .0 || 6.0
|- class="sortbottom"
| style="text-align:center;" colspan="2"|Career
| 1 || 0 || 12.0 || .300 || .000 || — || .0 || 1.0 || 1.0 || .0 || 6.0

College

|-
| style="text-align:left;"| 2017–18
| style="text-align:left;"| Washington
| 34 || 31 || 32.5 || .451 || .351 || .800 || 4.0 || 2.7 || 1.1 || .3 || 16.0
|-
| style="text-align:left;"| 2018–19
| style="text-align:left;"| Washington
| 36 || 36 || 34.4 || .502 || .440 || .779 || 5.3 || 3.1 || 1.3 || .3 || 16.2
|- class="sortbottom"
| style="text-align:center;" colspan="2"| Career
| 70 || 67 || 33.5 || .476 || .396 || .789 || 4.6 || 2.9 || 1.2 || .3 || 16.1

References

External links

Washington Huskies bio

1999 births
Living people
American men's basketball players
Basketball players from Seattle
Garfield High School (Seattle) alumni
Iowa Wolves players
Minnesota Timberwolves draft picks
Minnesota Timberwolves players
Shooting guards
Washington Huskies men's basketball players